Strijen is a town and former municipality in the western Netherlands, in the province of South Holland. On 1 January 2019 it was merged with the municipalities of Binnenmaas, Cromstrijen, Korendijk, and Oud-Beijerland to form the municipality of Hoeksche Waard.

Strijen hosts a public library, swimming pool, a small shopping centre and a local museum.

Furthermore, Strijen is home to an important and welcome resting stop for migrating birds, especially geese. During winter, the endangered Eurasian spoonbill uses this area as a foraging ground.

The municipality of Strijen also includes the population centres of Cillaarshoek, De Klem, Mookhoek, Oudendijk, and Strijensas.

Notable people 

Anton Corbijn (born 1955), photographer, music video director and film director.

References

External links 
 

Hoeksche Waard
Former municipalities of South Holland
Populated places in South Holland
Municipalities of the Netherlands disestablished in 2019